Polonia Słubice is a football club based in Słubice, Poland.

Current squad

References

External links
 Official website 

Football clubs in Poland
Association football clubs established in 1945
1945 establishments in Poland
Słubice County
Football clubs in Lubusz Voivodeship